John Force Racing is an NHRA drag racing team. In over 30 years of competition, John Force Racing has won one Top Fuel and 20 Funny Car championships. The current line-up of drivers includes Top Fuel drivers Brittany Force, Austin Prock and Funny car drivers John Force, Robert Hight. The team's leadership includes CEO John Force, President Robert Hight, Vice President Ashley Force Hood, and CFO Adria Hight. Past drivers include Gary Densham, Ashley Force Hood, team crew chief Mike Neff, Eric Medlen, who lost his life while racing for the team and whose number 4 appears on all their cars, Tony Pedregon, who was the first driver other than Force to win a series championship driving for the team, and Courtney Force.  In 2017, Brittany Force became the first team driver to win a championship in a classification that is not Funny Car, taking the Top Fuel title.

Force's team had a long term relationship with Castrol and Ford Motor Company, with Castrol serving as Force's primary sponsor for over 30 years and Ford his engine provider for 20 years. Both of those relationships came to an end following the 2014 season when British Petroleum, Castrol's parent company, ceased their sponsorship and Ford pulled out of the NHRA. Force's Funny Car teams now run Chevrolets, sponsored by Old World Industries.

Championships

References

National Hot Rod Association teams
American auto racing teams
Burmah-Castrol